Lomatium canbyi is a species of flowering plant in the carrot family known by the common name Canby's biscuitroot (lúukš in the Sahaptin language and qeqíit in the Nez Perce language). It is native to the Pacific Northwest of the United States and northeast California, where it grows in sagebrush-covered plateau habitat and barren flats.

It is a perennial herb growing up to about 25 centimeters tall. It lacks a stem, producing erect leaves and inflorescences from ground level. The leaves are up to 15 centimeters long and divided into many highly divided leaflets. The inflorescence is topped with a dense umbel of whitish flowers.

The Klamath and Modoc peoples use the roots of this plant as food.

References

External links

 Calflora Database: Lomatium canbyi (Canby's biscuitroot,  Canby's lomatium)
Jepson eFlora (TJM2) treatment of Lomatium canbyi
USDA Plants Profile for Lomatium canbyi (Canby's biscuitroot)
UC CalPhotos gallery for Lomatium canbyi

canbyi
Flora of California
Flora of the Northwestern United States
Flora of the Great Basin
Endemic flora of the United States
Plants used in Native American cuisine
Taxa named by John Merle Coulter
Flora without expected TNC conservation status